Major-General Sir Roy Michael Frederick Redgrave,  (16 September 1925 – 3 July 2011) was Commander of British Forces in Hong Kong.

Military career
Educated at Lambrook preparatory school and Sherborne School, Redgrave joined the Royal Horse Guards as a trooper in 1943 during World War II. In 1953 he managed the Hyde Park Horse Camp for the Coronation of the Queen. Then in the late 1950s he was deployed to Cyprus at the height of the EOKA resistance campaign.

He was made Commanding Officer of the Household Cavalry Regiment in 1962 and of the Royal Horse Guards in 1964. He became Commandant of the Royal Armoured Corps Centre in 1974 and Commandant of the British Sector in Berlin in 1975. He went on to be Commander of British Forces in Hong Kong in 1978 and retired in 1980.

Family life
He was related to the Redgrave family of actors, via his father Robin Roy Redgrave, who was the patriarch Roy Redgrave's son by his first wife. Thus he was a nephew of Sir Michael Redgrave and a first cousin of the half blood of Vanessa, Corin and Lynn Redgrave. He had two sons.

References

Publications
 Balkan Blue by Major General Sir Roy Redgrave KBE MC, published by Pen & Sword, London 2000
 Adventures of Colonel Daffodil by Major General Sir Roy Redgrave KBE MC, published by Pen & Sword, London 2007

 

|-

1925 births
2011 deaths
Military personnel from Bucharest
British Army major generals
British military personnel of the Cyprus Emergency
Knights Commander of the Order of the British Empire
People educated at Sherborne School
Recipients of the Military Cross
Royal Horse Guards officers
British Army personnel of World War II
British people of Romanian descent